Dario  is a masculine given name, etymologically related to Darius.

Given name
Dario Allevi (born 1965), Italian politician
Dario Argento (born 1940), Italian film director
Dario Badinelli (born 1946), Italian triple jumper
Dario Bellezza (1944–1996), Italian poet
Dario Benuzzi (born 1946), Italian test driver
Darío Botero (1938–2010), Colombian writer and philosopher
Dario Campeotto (born 1939), Danish singer, actor, entertainer
Dario Cologna (born 1986), Swiss cross-country skier
Dario Dainelli (born 1979), Italian footballer, former captain of Fiorentina
Dario Fo (1926–2016), Italian Nobel prize winner
Dario Franchitti (born 1973), Scottish Indianapolis 500 winner and IndyCar Series champion
Dario García (born 1968), Argentine judoka
Dario Hübner (born 1967), Italian footballer
Dario Lari (born 1979), Italian rower
Darío Lecman (born 1971), Argentine weightlifter
Dario Kordić (born 1960), Bosnian Croat politician, military commander and convicted war criminal
Dario Marianelli (born 1963), Italian film composer
Darío Moreno (1921–1968), Turkish-born Sephardic Jewish singer and composer
Dario Resta (1882–1924), Italian-born Anglo-American Indianapolis 500 winner
Dario José dos Santos (born 1946), Brazilian footballer
Dario Šarić (born 1994), Croatian basketball player
Darío Silva (born 1972), former Uruguayan footballer
Dario Šimić (born 1975), Croatian footballer
Dario Vidošić (born 1987), Australian footballer
Darío Villanueva (born 1950), Spanish literary critic

Fictional characters
Dario, the title character of L'incoronazione di Dario, a 1717 dramma per musica by Antonio Vivaldi, and the 1686 opera L'incoronazione di Dario (Perti)
 Dario, criminal in "Licence to Kill", played by Benicio Del Toro
Dario Bossi, in the video game Castlevania: Dawn of Sorrow
 Dario Brando, father of Dio Brando in the Japanese manga series JoJo's Bizarre Adventure
Dario Cueto, played by Luis Fernandez-Gil in the professional wrestling television series Lucha Underground

See also
Darius (disambiguation)
Daria (disambiguation)
Daario Naharis

Croatian masculine given names
Italian masculine given names
Polish masculine given names
Portuguese masculine given names
Spanish masculine given names
Romanian masculine given names